Parornix alpicola is a moth of the family Gracillariidae. It is known from the Alps and Scotland, where it is confined to calcareous coastal hillsides on the north coast, where the only known localities are the Invernaver National Nature Reserve and a spot on the east side of Loch Eriboll.

The wingspan is 8–10 mm. There is one generation per year.

The larvae feed on Dryas octopetala. They mine the leaves of their host plant. The larvae start by making a lower-surface epidermal corridor. Next, larvae begin to feed on the sponge parenchyma and later also on the palissade parenchyhma. This causes the initial corridor to become destroyed. The final mine is full depth and occupies about half of a leaf. It is located on one side of the midrib and is almost flat. Finally, the larva leaves the mine and spins a new leaf into a pod, that is eaten from the inside.

Taxonomy
Some authors consider Parornix alpicola to be a synonym of Parornix scoticella. Others argue that Parornix alpicola differs from scoticella in its much darker antenna, in having an even greater admixture of white in the pattern of the forewing and in having only the apical dot darker than the ground colour.

Furthermore, the Scottish population is often treated as the distinct subspecies leucostola

References

Parornix
Moths of Europe
Moths described in 1877